You Must Be Blonde on Capri (German: Blond muß man sein auf Capri) is a 1961 West German comedy film directed by Wolfgang Schleif and starring Karin Baal, Helmuth Lohner and Maurizio Arena. 

It was shot at West Berlin's Tempelhof Studios and on location at Baden-Baden and Naples. The film's sets were designed by the art director Hans Kuhnert.

Cast

References

Bibliography 
Hans-Michael Bock and Tim Bergfelder. The Concise Cinegraph: An Encyclopedia of German Cinema. Berghahn Books, 2009.
 Axel Schildt & Detlef Siegfried. Between Marx and Coca-Cola: Youth Cultures in Changing European Societies, 1960-1980. Berghahn Books, 2006.

External links 

1961 films
1961 comedy films
German comedy films
West German films
1960s German-language films
Films directed by Wolfgang Schleif
Films set in Naples
Films shot in Naples
Films shot at Tempelhof Studios
Films about vacationing
1960s German films